Christian Gottfried Krause (17 April 1717 – 4 May 1770) was a German lawyer, composer and music commentator.

Life 
Krause was born in Winzig (today Wińsko, Poland) into a musical family. His father was a Stadtpfeifer from whom he learned to play the flute, violin, keyboard and timpani. Krause studied law at the University in Frankfurt an der Oder, where he attended lectures by Alexander Gottlieb Baumgarten, among others. Baumgarten's ideas on aesthetic had a profound influence on Krause. In 1746 he moved to Berlin, where he died.

Krause's treatise Von der musikalischen Poesie (1753) marked the beginning of the Ersten Berliner Liederschule (first Berlin Lieder School).

Musical Works 
 Gelobet sey der Herr (Cantata) 1758
 Der Tod Jesu (Cantata, text by Karl Wilhelm Ramler) 1758
 Oden mit Melodien 1761
 Der lustige Schulmeister (Singspiel, text by Friedrich Nicolai) 1766 
 Lieder der deutschen mit Melodien in four volumes 1767-8

Krause's instrumental output includes a small amount of chamber music, orchestral sinfonias and partitas and keyboard works. There are also numerous pieces listed in 18th century catalogues which have not survived.

Literary works 
 Lettre à Mr. le Marquis de B. sur la difference de la Musique Italienne et la musique Francaise 1748
 Von der musikalischen Poesie 1752

References 
 Josef Beaujean: Christian Gottfried Krause. Sein Leben und seine Persönlichkeit im Verhältnis zu den musikalischen Problemen des 18. Jahrhunderts als Ästhetiker und Musiker. Inaugural-Dissertation der Universität Bonn. Dillingen a. D.: Schwäbische Verlagsdruckerei 1930.
 Darrell M. Berg: The Correspondence of Christian Gottfried Krause: A Music Lover in the Age of Sensibility. Ashgate 2009. 
 Paul F. Marks: The Rhetorical Element in Musical Sturm und Drang: Christian Gottfried Krause's »Von der Musikalischen Poesie«. International Review of the Aesthetics and Sociology of Music 2 (1971), S. 49-64.
 John Richard Edwards: Christian Gottfried Krause: mentor of the first Berlin song school. 1973.

External links 

18th-century German composers
1719 births
1770 deaths
German Classical-period composers
European University Viadrina alumni
People from Lower Silesian Voivodeship
Musicians from Berlin